Annette Messager (born 30 November 1943) is a French visual artist. In 2005 she won the Golden Lion Award at the Venice Biennale for her artwork at the French Pavilion. In 2016, she won the prestigious Praemium Imperiale International Arts Award. She lives and works in Malakoff, France.

Biography
Annette Messager was born on 30 November 1943 in Berck, France. Between 1962 and 1966, Messager attended the École des Arts Décoratifs in Paris, France.
She and the late artist Christian Boltanski were partners.

Career
Messager is known mainly for her installation work which often incorporates photographs, prints and drawings, and various materials. Her work rejects traditional methods in visual arts such as painting in favour of "bricolage" works that combine media and subvert value systems, often making experimental use of methods traditionally designated to a "so-called feminine sensibility."
"‘I found my voice as an artist when I stepped on a dead sparrow on a street in Paris in 1971. I didn’t know why, but I was sure this sparrow was important because it was something very fragile that was near me and my life, states Messager. The sparrow was soon joined by others and became the exhibit The Boarders, which launched her career in 1972.

She has exhibited and published her work extensively.

In 2005, she represented France at the Venice Biennale, where she won the Golden Lion for her Pinocchio-inspired installation that transformed the French pavilion into a casino. One of her most famous pieces is her exhibition The Messengers, which showcases an installation of rooms that include a series of photographs and toy-like, hand knit animals in costumes. For example, some of the animals' heads were replaced by heads of other stuffed animals to reflect the ways in which humans disguise themselves or transform their identities with costume.

In 2014, she created an installation titled Les Interdictions : a combination of the puppet motif and a pattern of sixty eight prohibitory signs from around the world. The only sign that was invented by the artist is a sign condemning prostitution.

Select solo exhibitions
 Musée de Peinture et de Sculpture, Grenoble: 1973, 1989–90 (touring retrospective)
 Musée d'Art Moderne de la Ville de Paris: 1974, 1984, 1995
 Rheinisches Landesmuseum, Bonn: 1976, 1978
 Galerie Isy Brachot, Brussels, 1977
 Holly Solomon Gallery, New York: 1978
 Galerie Gillespie-Laage Salomon, Paris: 1979, 1985
 St. Louis Art Museum: 1980
 Fine Arts Gallery, University of California, Berkeley: 1981
 St. Francisco Museum of Modern Art, 1981
 PS 1, Long Island City, NY: 1981
 Artists' Space, New York: 1981

 Musée de Beaux-Arts, Calais, 1983
 Musée d'Art Moderne de la Ville de Paris, 1984
 Gallerie d'Art contemporaine, Nice, 1986.
 Musee de Grenoble, 1989.
 Musee Departmentale, Chateau de Rochechouart, 1990.
 Douglas Hyde Gallery, Dublin, 1992.
 Arnolfini, Bristol, 1992.
 FRAC Picardie, 1993.
 Penetration, Museum of Modern Art, New York, 1995.
 Los Angeles County Museum of Art, 1995.
 The Messengers, Centre Georges Pompidou, Paris, 2007.
 Mori Art Museum, Tokyo 2008.
 The Messenger, Hayward Gallery, London 2009.
 Museo de Arte Contemporaneo (MARCO), Monterrey 2010.
 Zachęta National Gallery, Warsaw 2010.
 Antiguo Colegio de San Ildefonso, Mexico City 2011
 Galerie mfc-michèle didier, Paris, 2011. "Mes dessins secrets, Mon guide du tricot, Ma collection de champignons bons et de champignons mortels"
 Galerie mfc-michèle didier, Paris, November 2012 – January 2013. "Ma collection de proverbes"
Púdico-público, IVAM, València, 2018.

Select group exhibitions
 Couples. MoMA PS1, New York, 1978.
 Photography as Art. Institute of Contemporary Arts, London, 1979.
 Today's Art and Erotism. Kunstverein, Bonn, 1982.
 Images in Transition. National Museum of Modern Art, Kyoto. 1990.
 Parallel Visions. Los Angeles County Museum of Art, Los Angeles, 1992.
 A visage decouvert. Fondation Cartier pour l'Art Contemporain, Paris, 1992.
 Arrested Childhood. Center of Contemporary Art, North Miami, 1994.
 New Works for a New Space. ArtPace, San Antonio, Texas, 1995.
 elles@centrepompidou. Centre Georges Pompidou, Paris 2010.
 Dead Animals and the Curious Occurrence of Taxidermy in Contemporary Art. Brown University Bell Gallery, Providence, Rhode Island 2016.
 Dream On. NEON at the former Public Tobacco Factory, Athens, Greece 2022.

Select books
 Mes dessins secrets, Bruxelles, mfc-michèle didier, 2011. Edition of 24 numbered and signed copies and 6 artist's proofs. Voir mfc-michèle didier
 Ma collection de champignons bons et de champignons mortels, Bruxelles, mfc-michèle didier, 2011. Edition of 24 numbered and signed copies and 6 artist's proofs.
 Mon guide du tricot, Bruxelles, mfc-michèle didier, 2011. Edition of 24 numbered and signed copies and 6 artist's proofs.

In 2006, a book under the title Word for Word: Texts, Writings and Interviews (1971–2005) was published. It explores the writing in Annette Messager's artworks, and gathers numerous related texts published in magazines or catalogues, as well as unpublished notes on Messager's work and her personal reflections on art and life. All her interviews from 1974 to the present are also included.

Select editions
 Ma collection de proverbes, Bruxelles, mfc-michèle didier, 2012. Edition of 24 numbered and signed copies and 6 artist's proofs. Voir mfc-michèle didier

References

Sources
 Fabian Stech, J'ai parlé avec Lavier, Annette Messager, Sylvie Fleury, Hirschhorn, Pierre Huyghe, Delvoye, D.F.G. Hou Hanru, Sophie Calle, Minyg, Sans et Bourriaud. Presses du réel Dijon, 2007.
 Sheryl Conkelton and Carol Eliel, Annette Messager. Los Angeles County Museum of Art & The Museum of Modern Art, New York, 1995.

External links
 Interview with Annette Messager
 The Artists
 Source with some more references
 Communiqué présentation 3e rotation de l’exposition “elles”.
 Word for Word: Texts, Writings and Interviews (1971–2005)
 BOMB Magazine interview with Annette Messager by Bernard Marcade (Winter, 1989)

1943 births
Living people
French mixed-media artists
20th-century French painters
21st-century French painters
French photographers
Postmodern artists
Academic staff of the École des Beaux-Arts
École des Beaux-Arts alumni
20th-century French sculptors
École nationale supérieure des arts décoratifs alumni
Officiers of the Légion d'honneur
French contemporary artists
20th-century French women artists
21st-century French women artists